Nauru competed at the 2018 Commonwealth Games in the Gold Coast, Australia from April 4 to April 15, 2018.

Weightlifter Itte Detenamo was the island's flag bearer during the opening ceremony.

Medalists

Competitors
The following is the list of number of competitors participating at the Games per sport/discipline.

Athletics

Nauru participated with 2 athletes (1 man and 1 woman).

Men
Track & road events

Women
Field events

Boxing

Nauru participated with a team of 2 athletes (2 men).

Men

Weightlifting

Nauru participated with 10 athletes (6 men and 4 women).

Men

Women

Wrestling

Nauru participated with 2 athletes (2 men).

Men

See also
Nauru at the 2018 Summer Youth Olympics

References

Nations at the 2018 Commonwealth Games
Nauru at the Commonwealth Games
2018 in Nauruan sport